The Manchester Fiction Prize  is a literary award celebrating excellence in creative writing. It was launched by Carol Ann Duffy and The Manchester Writing School at Manchester Metropolitan University in 2009, as the second phase of the annual Manchester Writing Competition (which began in 2008 with the first Manchester Poetry Prize, judged by Duffy, Gillian Clarke and Imtiaz Dharker).

The Manchester Fiction Prize is open internationally to anyone aged 16 or over (there is no upper age limit) and awards a cash prize of £10,000 to the writer of the best short story submitted. In addition to this, the 2009 Manchester Fiction Prize offered a bursary for study at MMU, or cash equivalent, to an entrant aged 18–25 as part of the Jeffrey Wainwright Manchester Young Writer of the Year Award.

Entrants are asked to submit a complete short story, which can be on any subject, and written in any style, but must be new work, not published (in print or online) or submitted for consideration elsewhere. In 2009 the maximum story length was 5,000 words, reduced to 3,000 for the 2011 competition.

The 2009 competition was judged by novelists and short story writers Sarah Hall (writer), M. John Harrison and Nicholas Royle. The prize-winners were announced at a gala ceremony on Friday 23 October 2009, held at Manchester Town Hall. The ceremony opened the 2009 Manchester Literature Festival 'Short Weekend' and featured readings from two of the judges (Hall and Royle) and the six short-listed stories. The evening was hosted by James Draper from the Manchester Writing School at MMU and Matthew Frost from the Manchester Literature Festival. Toby Litt took the £10,000 first prize and Michael E. Halmshaw was named the Manchester Young Writer of the Year. The runners up were Peter Deadman, Vicki Jarrett, Jennifer Mills and Alison Moore.

The Manchester Writing School launched the second Manchester Fiction Prize in January 2011 with Nicholas Royle once again acting as Head Judge. The number of judges was increased from three to four in 2011, with short story writers Heather Beck, John Burnside and Alison MacLeod joining Royle on the panel. While the main prize remained at £10,000, and the competition was still open to anyone aged 16 or over, the Young Writer of the Year element was dropped as the rise in UK university tuition fees made it financially unfeasible to offer a bursary. The 2011 Prize received a record number of entries - almost 1,900 from over 45 countries - and the judges were so impressed with the overall quality that they asked to increase the short-list from six to eight, and to commend an additional 31 stories ; the international nature of the competition was reflected in the make-up of the short-list, with four finalists from the UK, three from the USA and one from Canada. The prize was awarded at a ceremony held once again as part of the Manchester Literature Festival, this time taking place at Chetham's School of Music in the centre of Manchester on the evening of Friday 14 October; Draper and Frost returned as hosts, this time working as a comical double-act. Head Judge Nicholas Royle spoke about the difficulty of choosing a winner and announced that the panel had decided to split the prize, awarding a first prize of £7,500 to Krishan Coupland and a second prize of £2,500 to Richard Hirst. The runners up were Nicole Cullen, Garret Freymann-Weyr, Silvia Moreno-Garcia, Alex Preston, Bethany Rogers and Judith Turner-Yamamoto. In 2013, the prize became an annual event .

External links 
Manchester Writing Competition
The Guardian 3/11/2009 Manchester Literary Renaissance
MMU Writing School
Manchester Literature Festival
The Manchester Fiction Prize 2009 Facebook
Manchester Writing Competition
National Association of Writers in Education - Manchester Fiction Prize Gala 2009
Manchester Writing Competition Gala Prize Giving Ceremony 2013

Awards established in 2009
Culture in Manchester
British fiction awards